The Miami Limestone, originally called Miami Oolite, is a geologic formation of limestone in southeastern Florida. 

Miami Limestone forms the Atlantic Coastal Ridge in southeastern Florida, near the coast in Palm Beach, Broward and Miami Dade counties.  It also lies under the eastern (Miami-Dade County) part of the Everglades, Florida Bay, and the lower Florida Keys from Big Pine Key to the Marquesas Keys. Mitchell-Tapping also states that a component of the Miami Limestone extends under the Gulf of Mexico north to a point 112 kilometers west of Tampa.

The part of the Miami Limestone forming the Atlantic Coastal Ridge and the lower Florida Keys is an oolitic grainstone which includes fossils of corals, echinoids, mollusks, and algae. The oolitic formation in the lower Florida Keys has less quartz sand and fewer fossils than does the oolitic formation on the mainland. Based on those differences, Mitchel-Tapping divided the Miami Limestone into the Fort Dallas oolite on the mainland and under northern Florida Bay, and the Key West oolite, under southern Florida Bay and the lower Florida Keys. The fossils in the formation underlying the Everglades, which does not include any ooids, consists primarily of a single bryozoan species, Schizoporella floridana.

The Miami Limestone was deposited during the Sangamon interglacial, when southern Florida was under a shallow sea. Falling sea levels during the Wisconsin glaciation exposed the formation to air and rain, and rainwater percolating through the deposits replaced aragonite with calcite and formed an indurated rock.

See also

 List of fossiliferous stratigraphic units in Florida

Citations

References

Geologic formations of Florida